This list of dead heat horse races includes wins between two or more horses, where the winner could not be determined by a photo finish. Before the 20th century, dead heat horse races could be settled by a second deciding race, unless the owners agreed to divide the prize.

 April 24, 1801in the King's Plate at Newmarket, between Worthy and Sorcerer, Worthy won in a deciding heat.
 May 15, 1828in the Epsom Derby, between Cadland and The Colonel; Cadland won in a deciding heat.
 June 21, 1832in the Ascot Gold Cup, between Camarine and Rowton; Camarine won in a deciding heat.
 September 18, 1850in the St. Leger Stakes, between Voltigeur and Russborough; Voltigeur won in a deciding heat.
 April 28, 1868in the 2000 Guineas, between Formosa and Moslem.
 September 3, 1879in the Grosser Preis von Baden between Kincsem and Prince Giles The First. Kincsem won in a deciding heat.
 May 28, 1884in the Epsom Derby, between Harvester and St. Gatien.
 June 13, 1900in the Coronation Stakes, between Sainte Nitouche and Winifreda.
 July 3, 1900in the July Stakes, between Doricles and Veles.
 September 27, 1910in the Dewhurst Plate at Newmarket Racecourse, between King William and Phryxus.
 July 5, 1926in the Carter Handicap at Aqueduct Racetrack, between Macaw and Nedana.
 April 18, 1927in the Great Eastern Steeplechase at Oakbank Racecourse between Unohoo and Mt. Cooper. 
 May 4, 1939in the Churchill Downs Handicap at Churchill Downs, Between Arab's Arrow and Kings Blue. 
 June 10, 1944in the Carter Handicap at Aqueduct Racetrack, between Brownie, Bossuet, and Wait A Bit; the first triple dead heat in a stakes race.
 April 1951in the Mildmay of Flete Challenge Cup at Cheltenham Festival, between Canford and Slender.
 March 1953in the St James's Place Foxhunter Chase at Cheltenham Festival, between Dunboy II and Merry.
 October 3, 1953at Freehold Raceway, between Patchover, Payne Hall, and Penny Maid; the first triple dead heat in harness racing for a win.
 November 3, 1956in the Hotham Handicap at Flemington Racecourse, Melbourne, between Fighting Force, Ark Royal, and Pandie Sun.
 July 3, 1957at Hollywood Park Racetrack, between Joe's Pleasure, Challenger Tom, and Leaful; the first triple dead-heat for a win at Hollywood Park.
 November 27, 1957at Roosevelt Raceway in New York, between Flaxey Dream, Great Knight and Navy Song.
 December 27, 1957at Westport Trotting Club, New Zealand, between Wimpy, Night Owl and Keff; the first trotting triple dead heat determined by a photo finish.  
 October 14, 1970at Windsor Raceway, Ontario, between Arnold Gem, Banjo Phil, and Bervaldo.
 August 12, 1972in the Adios Stakes at The Meadows, between Jay Time and Strike Out.
 April, 1977in the Aintree Hurdle, between Monksfield and Night Nurse.
 July 6, 1980in the Grand Prix de Saint-Cloud, between Dunette and Shakapour.
 May, 1984in the Lockinge Stakes, between Cormorant Wood and Wassl 
 January 28, 1987in the Rod Carmichael Handicap at Stony Creek Racecourse, between Fast Seal, Mr Spectre and Chesterfield; a triple dead heat.
 May 2, 1988at Hippodrome Trois Rivieres, between Jack Des Rivieres, Kingwood Tog and H F Elaine; the fifteenth triple dead heat for a win in harness racing history.
 October 14, 1988in the Dewhurst Stakes, between Prince of Dance and Scenic.
 August 5, 1989in the Hambletonian Stakes, between Park Avenue Joe and Probe; a court case determined the proportion of the purse awarded to each horse.
 1995in the Hong Kong Champions & Chater Cup, between Makarpura Star and Survey King.
 December 7, 1995in Race 4 at Hollywood Park Racetrack, between Tina Celesta, Chans Pearl and Cool Miss Ann; a triple dead heat.
 April 6, 1996 - Between Gilhuer and Impervious at Pambula in a two horse race.
 May 12, 1996in the third race at Yakima Meadows, between Fly Like A Angel, Allihavonztheradio and Terri After Five; a triple dead heat.
 August 21, 1997in the Nunthorpe Stakes at York Racecourse, between Ya Malak and Coastal Bluff, with Alex Greaves on Ya Malak becoming the first woman to win a Group One race in Great Britain.
 September 27, 1998in the Kentucky Cup Classic, between Silver Charm and Wild Rush.
 2001in the Great Northern Steeplechase at Ellerslie Racecourse, between Smart Hunter and Sir Avon.  
 2003in the Breeders' Cup Turf at Santa Anita Park, between High Chaparral and Johar.
 March 2004in the Dubai Duty Free Stakes at Nad Al Sheba Racecourse, between Right Approach and Paolini.
 September 2004in the Doncaster Cup, between Millenary and Kasthari
 March 2006in the Doncaster Mile Stakes, between Kandidate and Vanderlin
 September 30, 2007in the Fenwolf Stakes at Ascot, between Distinction and Solent
 September 24, 2008in the Foundation Stakes at Goodwood, between Hearthstead Maison and Tranquil Tiger
 March 2009 at The Meadows, between Tsm Goldenridge, Serious Damage and Teen Elvis; the 25th triple dead heat in harness racing history.
 May 23, 2010in the 71st Yushun Himba ("Japanese Oaks") at Tokyo Racecourse, between Apapane and Saint Emilion; the first Japanese Grade I race to result in a dead heat for the win.
 November 21, 2010in the Jockey Club Sprint at Sha Tin Racecourse, Hong Kong, between Singapore representative Rocket Man and Hong Kong representative One World.
 April 17, 2011in the Maharaja Harisinghji Trophy at Mahalaxmi Racecourse, Mumbai, between Sprint Star and Misschievous Trot; the first dead heat in a graded race in the history of Indian horse racing. 
 July 16, 2011in the American Oaks at Hollywood Park, between Cambina and Nereid.
 September 10, 2011in the Irish St. Leger, between Duncan and Jukebox Jury.
 August 18, 2012 - At Lingfield Park Racecourse in a two-horse race between Ayaar and Snowboarder.
 August 25, 2012in the Travers Stakes, between Alpha and Golden Ticket.
 March 9, 2013 - At Flemington Racecourse in the Blamey Stakes between Pussiance De Lune and Budriguez.  
 May 31, 2013 - At Belmont Park between Anaphylaxis and Copper Forrest.
 May 31, 2013 - At Belmont Park between Leave of Absence and Smash.
 August 31, 2013in the Atalanta Stakes, between Integral and Ladys First.
 April 11, 2014at Evangeline Downs, between All In The Art, Chessie Slew, and Memories Of Trina; a triple dead heat.
 May 31, 2014in the Grand Cup at York, between Clever Cookie and Ralston Road.
 October 18, 2014in the Caulfield Sprint at Caulfield Racecourse, Melbourne, between Miracles of Life and Bel Sprinter.
 December 19, 2015in the Ladbroke Handicap Hurdle at Ascot, between Jolly's Cracked It and Sternrubin.
 September 3, 2016in the Spinaway Stakes at Saratoga Racecourse, between Sweet Loretta and Pretty City Dancer.
 November 12, 2016in the High Sheriff of Gloucestershire's Mares' Standard Open NH Flat Race at Cheltenham Racecourse, between My Khaleesi and Irish Roe.
 September 22, 2018in the Ayr Gold Cup, between Baron Bolt and Son of Rest.
February 20, 2021in the Oakleigh Plate, between Celebrity Queen and Portland Sky.
February 23, 2021 - At Bendigo, between Cloudy and Seradess.
May 1, 2021 - in the Old Forester Bourbon Turf Classic Stakes at Churchill Downs, between Colonel Liam and Domestic Spending
May 21, 2021 - At Santa Anita Park between Mountain Spirit and Press Briefing.
August 30, 2021 - in the EBF Restricted Novice Staked at Ripon Racecourse, between Maybe Even Never and Sunday Justice
October 16, 2021 - At Eagle Farm Racecourse, between Vendidit and Ciccina. However the jockey of Vendidit lodged a protest against Ciccina against for interference in the home straight. A counter protest was lodged by the jockey of Ciccina against Vendidit alleging interference near the 1200m. As the stewards could not be satisficed that the extent of the interference to both horses affected the race result both protests were dismissed and the dead heat stood.
November 20, 2021 - At Ballarat between Silent Sovereign and Just Benjamin
 November 27, 2021 - At Newcastle in the Grade 1 Fighting Fifth Hurdle between Epatante and Not So Sleepy
 April 2, 2022 - At Bendigo between Foxy Frida and Sirileo Miss
 August 13, 2022 - At Newmarket, between Canterbury Bell and Total Lockdown
 October 1, 2022 - in the Epsom Handicap at Royal Randwick between Top Ranked and Ellsberg

References

Horse racing-related lists
Horse races, dead heat